Samwel Chebolei Masai (born 20 March 2001) is a Kenyan middle-distance runner.

Career
In February, 2019 Chebole Masai won the national junior cross country 8 km title at the Eldoret Sports Club. He then competed for Kenya at the 2019 IAAF World Cross Country Championships in Aarhus, Denmark in March, 2019 finishing 8th in the junior category in a time of 24.19 in the individual race and contributing to the team's bronze in the team event.

He ran a new personal best in Hengelo on 8 June 2021 of 13:12.55 over 5000m. On June 19, 2021, he earned a spot on the Kenyan team for the 2020 Summer Games in the 5000m after finishing in the top 3 at the Kenyan Olympic trials in a time of 13:17.40. However, despite being on the start list of athletes he did not start his 5000m heat in Tokyo.

References

External links

2001 births
Living people
Kenyan male middle-distance runners
21st-century Kenyan people